Briama is a chiefdom in Kambia District of Sierra Leone with a population of 29,392. Its principal town is Kukuna.

References

Chiefdoms of Sierra Leone
Northern Province, Sierra Leone